Ranni may refer to:

 Ranni, Kerala, a village and taluka in Kerala, India.
 Ranni (State Assembly constituency)
 Rodolfo Ranni (born 1937), Italian-Argentine actor
 Ranni the Witch, a character in the video game Elden Ring

See also
 
 Rani (disambiguation)
 Rannís